de Fay is a French surname. Notable people with the surname include:

 Charles César de Fay de La Tour-Maubourg (1757–1831), French soldier
 Juste-Charles de Fay de La Tour-Maubourg (1774–1824), French marquess
 Marie Victor de Fay, marquis de Latour-Maubourg (1768–1850), French cavalry commander